Alfred Beierle (4 June 1885 – 16 March 1950) was a German stage and film actor.

Selected filmography
 The League of Three (1929)
 The Flute Concert of Sanssouci (1930)
 The Tiger Murder Case (1930)
 Oh Those Glorious Old Student Days (1930)
 The Duke of Reichstadt (1931)
 My Leopold (1931)
 Bobby Gets Going (1931)
 In the Employ of the Secret Service (1931)
 Gloria (1931)
 Crime Reporter Holm (1932)
 The Daredevil (1931)
 Express 13 (1931)
 The Captain from Köpenick (1931)
 The Stranger (1931)
 Gypsies of the Night (1932)
 The Heath Is Green (1932)
 Man Without a Name (1932)
 The Victor (1932)
 The White Demon (1932)
 The Big Bluff (1933)
 The Burning Secret (1933)
 Life Begins Tomorrow (1933)
 The Flower Girl from the Grand Hotel (1934)
 A Woman with Power of Attorney (1934)
 The Violet of Potsdamer Platz (1936)
 Under Blazing Heavens (1936)

References

Bibliography 
 Alpi, Deborah Lazaroff. Robert Siodmak: A Biography, with Critical Analyses of His Films Noirs and a Filmography of All His Works. McFarland, 1998.

External links 
 

Film people from Berlin
1885 births
1950 deaths
German male film actors
German male silent film actors
20th-century German male actors
German male stage actors